Albert Ronsin (20 July 1928 – 2 July 2007) was a 20th-century French scholar, historian, librarian, and curator in Saint-Dié-des-Vosges.

Historian 
He undertook historical research, especially about the Age of Discovery. He was particularly interested in the history of the name America given by Martin Waldseemüller to the continent that Amerigo Vespucci passed through and described. He studied globes and World maps of the early sixteenth, including Johannes Schöner globe created by Johann Schoener and Waldseemüller's maps.

Works 
2006: Le nom de l'Amérique, l'invention des chanoines et savants de Saint-Dié, Éditions La Nuée bleue, Strasbourg
1992: Découverte et baptême de l'Amérique, Éditions Georges LePape, Montréal : 1979 (épuisé); réédition revue et augmentée, Éditions de l'Est
1991: La fortune d'un nom : America, baptême de l'Amérique à Saint-Dié-les-Vosges, Éditions Jérôme Millon, Grenoble
1990: Les Vosgiens célèbres: dictionnaire biographique illustré, Éditions Gérard Louis
1984: Répertoire bibliographique des livres imprimés en France au XVIIe siècle. Lorraine et Trois-évêchés, Éditions Koerner, Baden-Baden.
1979: Propositions pour une nouvelle structure des médiathèques publiques en France, Éditions Médiathèques publiques n°49, January–March.
1969: Saint-Dié-les-Vosges 669-1969, Éditions Publicité Moderne, Nancy.

He also published more than a hundred essays, notes and articles in various journals, annals, bulletins and historical, scientific and economic works.

References

External links 
  Biographie d'Albert Ronsin

French librarians
French curators
20th-century French historians
Knights of the Ordre national du Mérite
Chevaliers of the Ordre des Arts et des Lettres
1928 births
Writers from Blois
2007 deaths